is a Finnish commercial television channel. It started out as Helsinki's local television channel PTV in 1990 on the HTV cable network (now part of DNA Welho), and changed its name first to PTV4. On June 1, 1997, the channel expanded to national coverage and changed its name to Nelonen, the Finnish name of the number four. Nelonen is mostly owned by Sanoma Corporation, which owns the Helsingin Sanomat and Ilta-Sanomat newspapers. Its largest owner was Aatos Erkko. Much of its programming is imported Australian, American, British, and European programs with Finnish captions. Its main market is the 25-44 demographic.

Programming

Finnish series and shows
Extreme Duudsonit
Haluatko miljonääriksi?
Mysteerilaulajat
Reikä seinässä
Talent Suomi
The Voice of Finland
Vain elämää
Koskinen

Imported series, telenovelas and animated shows
90210
Accidentally on Purpose
Alias
All in the Family
American Chopper
America's Got Talent
America's Next Top Model
Avatar: The Last Airbender
Bad Girls
Battlestar Galactica
Big Brother Australia (series 12 onwards)
Big City Greens
Big Love
BoBoiBoy
Bob the Builder
Brainiac: Science Abuse
Breaking Bad
Britain's Next Top Model
Brotherhood
Californication
Canada's Next Top Model
Cashmere Mafia
Castle
Camp Lazlo (2006-2009)
Charmed
Commander in Chief
Criminal Minds
Dawson's Creek
Days of Our Lives
Damages
Deadwood
Desperate Housewives
Detroit 1-8-7
Dexter
Digimon
Dirt
Dirty Sexy Money
Dr. Phil
Drop Dead Diva
DuckTales
Early Edition
Everybody Hates Chris
Everybody Loves Raymond
Extreme Makeover
Fear Factor
Felicity
FlashForward
Footballer's Wives
Frasier
FashionTelevision
Ghost Whisperer
Greek
Gravity Falls
Grey's Anatomy
Harper's Island
How to Get Away with Murder
Inspector Rex
Jericho
Jerseylicious
Judging Amy
Kung Faux
Kyle XY
La Usurpadora
Las Vegas
LazyTown
Less than Perfect
Life as We Know It
Lost
Mad Men
Married... with Children
MasterChef Australia
Medical Investigation
Medium
Men Behaving Badly
My Little Pony: Friendship Is Magic
My Little Pony: Pony Life
MythBusters
Newlyweds: Nick and Jessica
NCIS
NCIS: Los Angeles
Nurse Jackie
Oggy and the Cockroaches
Oz
Phineas and Ferb
Pimp My Ride
Pretty Little Liars
Punk'd
Quantico
Queer as Folk
Rescue Me
Rome
RSPCA Animal Rescue
Robson Arms
Samantha Who?
Santa Barbara
Scrubs
Secret Diary of a Call Girl
Seinfeld
Sex and the City
South Park
Star vs. the Forces of Evil
So You Think You Can Dance
So You Think You Can Dance Canada
Space: Above and Beyond
Special Agent OsoSunset BeachThat '70s ShowThe 4400The BachelorThe CleanerThe ComebackThe CutThe Emperor's New SchoolThe GameThe Good WifeThe King of QueensThe NannyThe Oprah Winfrey ShowThe ShieldThe SopranosThe VoiceThe West WingThresholdTotal WipeoutTotal Wipeout USAWander Over YonderTrailer Park BoysUgly BettyWeedsWhat About BrianWife SwapWildfireWizards of Waverly Place Logos and identities 

 Criticism 
Nelonen was launched quickly and in an unprepared state. It has been criticized for importing "trash shows", especially during its first years. Mostly the subject of criticism have been related to its weekly imported "4D documentaries" concentrating on entertainment value and on highly emotive issues instead of artistic or other deeper values. The channel's entertainment output also consists of many other programmes which may be considered to be poor quality - imported game shows or Finnish versions of them (such as Reikä seinässä, a Finnish version of the Japanese 'Human Tetris' game) and reality TV shows dominate the scheduling. On the other hand, Nelonen's scheduling also contains several award-winning drama series.

 Controversy 
During the fall of 2007, a day after the Jokela school shooting, Nelonen decided not to air a scheduled episode of the TV series Dexter''. The TV series depicts a fictional serial killer Dexter Morgan and it was said to be inappropriate after such dramatic and nationwide turn of events. The episode was instead shown a week later.

References

External links
Nelonen
Jim
Liv
Hero

1997 establishments in Finland
Television channels in Finland
Television channels and stations established in 1997
Mass media in Helsinki